Bullet Bill may refer to

Bullet Bill (Mario), an enemy in the Mario franchise
Bullet Bill Dudley (1921–2010), professional American football player

Lists of people by nickname